Yu In-chon (born March 20, 1951) is a South Korean actor and a former Minister of Ministry of Culture and Tourism. Yu In-chon was born in the city of Jeonju, North Jeolla Province, South Korea in 1951. He graduated with the bachelor degree in theater and film from Chung-Ang University. Although Yu started his career as a TV actor, his fondness of play led him to found You Theater in the Gangnam area of Seoul, 1999.

Filmography

Films 
Chastity (정조 Jeongjo), 1979
Painful Maturity (아픈 성숙 Nan moleugessne), 1980
A Battle Journal (종군수첩 Jonggun sucheob), 1981
The Tree Blooming with Love (사랑이 꽃피는 나무 Salang-e kkochpineun namu), 1981 
The Lover of a Friend (친구애인 Chingu-ein), 1982
The Foolish Woman (바보스러운 여자 Baboseureowun yeoja), 1983
Rose Woman (장미부인 Jangmi buin), 1983
Born on February 30th (2wol 30ilsaeng), 1983
Reminiscent Flame (불의 회상 Bul-ui hoesang), 1984
Agada (아가다 Agada), 1984
Invited People (초대받은 성웅들 Chodaebadeun seongwungdeul), 1984
Diary of King Yeonsan (연산일기 Yeonsan-ilgi), 1987
Flower Blooms Even on a Windy Day (Barambuneun nal-e-do kkoch-eun pigo), 1987
0.917 (영점구일칠 Yeongjeomguchilil), 1987
Aje Aje Bara Aje (아제아제 바라아제), 1989
Honeymoon (밀월 Milwol), 1989
Kim's War (김의 전쟁 Gim-ui jeonjaeng), 1992
Change (체인지 Che-inji), 1996
Firebird (Bulsae 불새), 1997)
Doctor K (닥터K 1999)
Wonderful Days (원더풀데이즈 Wondeopeul Daei-jeu) (2003) 
Possible Changes (가능한 변화들 Ganeung-han byeonhwa-deul) (2004)

TV dramas 
Jeonwon ilgi (전원일기), 1980
Sarang-gwa jinsil (사랑과 진실), 1984
Yamang-ui sewol (야망의 세월), 1989
Bulsae (불새), 1987
Jeongdeun-nim (정든 님), 1992
Ilchulbong (일출봉), 1992
Tokkaebi-ga ganda (도깨비가 간다), 1994
Saeya saeya parangsae-ya (새야 새야 파랑새야), 1994
Yeoneo-ga doraol-ttae (연어가 돌아올 때), 1996
Sebeonjjae namja (세 번째 남자), 1997
Gobaek (고백), 2002
Jang Huibin (장희빈), 2002

Theater

Awards 
1980, the 16th PaekSang Arts Awards : TV부문 신인상 (안국동 아씨(MBC))
1986, the 22nd PaekSang Arts Awards : TV부문 인기상 (첫사랑(MBC))
1987, the 23rd PaekSang Arts Awards : TV부문 연기상 (불새(MBC))
1988, the 24th PaekSang Arts Awards : 영화부문 인기상 (연산일기)
1990, the 26th PaekSang Arts Awards : TV부문 인기상
1991, the 27th PaekSang Arts Awards : TV부문 연기상 (야망의 세월(KBS2))
1992, the 28th PaekSang Arts Awards : 영화부문 연기상 (김의 전쟁)
1993, the 29th PaekSang Arts Awards : TV부문 인기상 (일출봉(MBC))

References

External links
 

1951 births
Living people
People from Jeonju
South Korean male actors
Chung-Ang University alumni
Government ministers of South Korea
South Korean actor-politicians
Best Actor Paeksang Arts Award (theatre) winners
Best New Actor Paeksang Arts Award (television) winners